Université Club Kankan is Guinean professional soccer club based in Kankan, Guinea. The club currently play in the top soccer league in Guinea.

Kankan
Football clubs in Guinea